Aljami "Al" Durham (born September 30, 1998)  is an American professional basketball player who plays for the Caledonia Gladiators of the British Basketball League. He played college basketball for the Indiana Hoosiers and the Providence Friars.

Early life and high school career
Durham attended Berkmar High School at Lilburn, Georgia.

College career
Durham played for the Indiana Hoosiers from 2017 to 2021. As a sophomore, he averaged 8.3 points and 1.9 rebounds per game, shooting 40 percent from behind the arc. Following the season, he declared for the 2019 NBA draft, before eventually withdrawing. Durham averaged 11.3 points and 3.1 rebounds per game. After four years with Indiana, he transferred to Providence. Durham averaged 13.6 points, 3.4 assists, and 3.4 rebounds per game as a graduate transfer, helping the Friars reach the Sweet 16. He declared for the 2022 NBA draft following the season.

Professional career
On August 15, 2022, Durham started his professional career overseas, signing with Lavrio of the Greek Basket League. He was released from the club in December of the same year.

References

External links
Indiana Hoosiers bio
Providence Friars bio

1998 births
Living people
American men's basketball players
American expatriate basketball people in Greece
Indiana Hoosiers men's basketball players
Providence Friars men's basketball players
Lavrio B.C. players
Shooting guards
American expatriate basketball people in the United Kingdom
American expatriate sportspeople in Scotland
People from Lilburn, Georgia
Basketball players from Georgia (U.S. state)